Granby Halls was a popular live music, exhibition and sports arena in Leicester, England, also notable as the long serving home of professional basketball team, the Leicester Riders, from 1980 until 1999.

The Rolling Stones played two nights there 14/15 May 1976 and Oasis played one night 17 November 1995.

It was located in a triangle of prime land in central Leicester between the Welford Road Stadium (Leicester Tigers' home stadium), Leicester Royal Infirmary and Nelson Mandela Park and consisted of two halls, the main arena and a skating rink. The site was used for various functions since its initial opening in 1915, when it was built as the training halls for Leicester's Army recruits during World War I.

The building was finally demolished in 2001 after standing dormant for 3 years. The site is now used as a carpark while the council are still deciding what to do with the land, which is on the market for £1.3 million.

The site is now the Hotel Brooklyn

References

External links
History of Granby Halls

Buildings and structures in Leicester
Music venues in Leicestershire
Culture in Leicestershire
Leicester Riders
Sports venues in Leicester
Demolished buildings and structures in England
Sports venues demolished in 2001